R509 road may refer to:
 R509 road (Ireland)
 R509 road (South Africa)